Megalaemyia costalis is a species of ulidiid or picture-winged fly in the genus Megalaemyia of the family Tephritidae.

References

Ulidiidae